The  is a  high pyramid in northern Mexico City. It is located in the intersection of Avenida de los Insurgentes, Circuito Interior and Calzada Vallejo, in the Cuauhtémoc borough.

The monument consists of three superimposed truncated pyramids decorated with several sculptures on the sides and an eagle on the tip. The pyramid was designed by Francisco Borbolla and the stone sculptures and its layout by Luis Lelo de Larrea. The copper-and-steel eagle was cast by French animalier Georges Gardet, and the bronze high reliefs were created by Mexican sculptor Jesús Fructuoso Contreras. The eagle was originally intended to be placed on top of the never-completed Federal Legislative Palace—later replaced with the Monumento a la Revolución in downtown Mexico City—, while the reliefs were based on those created for the Aztec Palace, presented in the Mexican pavilion of the 1889 Paris Exposition.

Its construction started in 1930 and was completed ten years later. It was inaugurated in 1940, on the Día de la Raza (Columbus Day), and it is dedicated to la Raza—the indigenous peoples of the Americas and their descendants.

Background 

At the beginning of the 20th century, Mexico was in a period of transformation. President Porfirio Díaz governed the country intermittently from 1876 to 1911. During his term, known as the Porfiriato, Díaz boosted the economy through the improvement of the railroad network and international businesses. This benefited the upper class and hacendados (landowners) but affected the middle, working, and underclasses. The indigenous population was seen as a problem for the country's modernization and the government sought means to facilitate their integration into the Porfirian society. In 1911, Diaz was forced to resign after the Mexican Revolution broke out. The conflict lasted until 1920 and the Europhile government was replaced with one that promoted indigenismo—a political ideology that exalts the Latin American indigenous population.

At the start of the 20th century, Spain adapted the Columbus Day into the Día de la Raza to celebrate the arrival of Christopher Columbus to the Americas on 12 October 1942. Faustino Rodríguez-San Pedro y Díaz-Argüelles, president of the  promoted it and multiple Latin American countries adopted it. In 1925, José Vasconcelos (1882–1959), Mexican philosopher, published the essay "The Cosmic Race", where he wrote that as the Native American genes were the last ones to be mixed with the other human races, a new race would surge to create Universópolis, where the distinctions of race and nationality would be suppressed. Three years later, the Día de la Raza was officially celebrated in the country.

Name and dedication 
The monument is dedicated to and is named after la Raza, a Spanish-language term referring to the indigenous peoples of the Americas and their descendants, and used by Hispanophone Western populations that spread after the end of the Mexican Revolution and with the beginning of the Chicano Movement in the United States.

La Raza is literally translated to English as "the race", but the phrasal sense is "the people". Thus, the Monumento a la Raza is known in English by different names, including "Monument to the Race", "Monument to the People", "Monument to La Raza", and "La Raza Monument".

History and construction 

The construction of the Monumento a la Raza started in 1930. The project was sponsored by the government and was designed by the engineer Francisco Borbolla and the architect Luis Lelo de Larrea. Borbolla intended to reflect the history of Mexico in the monument; Lelo de Larrea was advised by Mexican architect Augusto Petriccioli. It was completed in 1940 and it was inaugurated on that 12 October—the Día de la Raza.

In late July 2022, the monument was graffitied. Neighbors in the area reported that it has no surveillance at night.

Location 
The monument lies on the median strip of Avenida de los Insurgentes, near Circuito Interior and Calzada Vallejo, in the colonia (neighborhood) San Simón Tolnáhuac, in the Cuauhtémoc borough. The monument can be visited daily from 12 p.m. to 8 p.m. Access to the monument was temporarily closed during the COVID-19 pandemic in Mexico.

Description 

It has four sides, each built with sloped smooth walls over the rafters, and that are decorated as well with reliefs based on the Xochicalco's Feathered Serpent.

The sculpture of the eagle on top is placed on a pedestal and it is made of copper and steel. The sculpture was designed by Georges Gardet, for the Porfirian Federal Legislative Palace. By the time Díaz was removed from the presidency, only the foundations had been built. Years later, Mexican architect Carlos Obregón Santacilia replaced the project with the Monumento a la Revolución.

Each side of the pyramid at the top features one high relief created with bronze castings by Jesús Fructuoso Contreras. Contreras cast them for the Aztec Palace, presented in the Mexican pavilion at the 1889 Paris Exposition.

At the base, there are two staircases: the south one connects with the top of the monument; the north one with the main door. At the start of each staircase, there are sculptures of Tenochtitlan-inspired serpent heads. On the remaining sides, there are two sculptures by Lelo de Larrea: Grupo de la fundación de México on the east and Grupo defensa de Tenochtitlán on the west.

Gallery

Reception 
Santacilia called the Monumento a la Raza "ridiculous" and said it was a caricature of the Pre-Columbian architecture. Mexican writer  (1918–2003) thought it was "espantoso" ("dreadful"). According to historian Mauricio Tenorio-Trillo, the monument is an irony, because it tries to depart "from the old regime's Francophilia", yet it recycles many of the symbols and materials "created by the Porfirian years of experimenting in modernity and nationalism". Writer Donald R. Fletcher described it as an "imposing Mayan pyramid".

La Raza metro station, located nearby the monument, depicts the monument in its pictogram and is named after it.

See also 
 Garden of the Triple Alliance, which also features the reliefs by Contreras
 Monumento a los Indios Verdes, two statues also created for the 1889 Paris Exposition
 Le Perthus Pyramid, another 20th-century emulation of Mesoamerican pyramids

References

Bibliography

External links 

 
 

1940 establishments in Mexico
1940 sculptures
Buildings and structures completed in 1940
Cuauhtémoc, Mexico City
Indigenous peoples in Mexico City
Monuments and memorials in Mexico City
Outdoor sculptures in Mexico City
Pyramids in Mexico
Vandalized works of art in Mexico